Collections is a compilation album by keyboardist and composer Yanni, released on the Sony BMG Music Entertainment label in 2008.

Track listing

References

External links
Official Website

Yanni albums
2008 compilation albums